Shields Township may refer to one of the following places:

In Canada

 Shields township, Algoma District, Ontario (geographical / historical)

In the United States

 Shields Township, Lake County, Illinois
 Shields Township, Holt County, Nebraska

See also
Shields (disambiguation)

Township name disambiguation pages